Thomas Henry Kavanagh VC (15 July 1821 – 13 November 1882) was an Irish recipient of the Victoria Cross, the highest and most prestigious award for gallantry which can be awarded to British and Commonwealth forces.

He is one of only five civilians to have ever been awarded the VC.

Indian Mutiny

Kavanagh was a 36-year-old civilian in the Bengal Civil Service, an assistant commissioner in Oudh during the Indian Mutiny, when the following deed took place on 9 November 1857 at the Siege of Lucknow, India for which he was awarded the Victoria Cross:

An erratum appeared in a later edition of the London Gazette stating that the deed was actually performed on 9 November as follows:

Later life
Kavanagh died in Gibraltar on 13 November 1882, and is buried at North Front Cemetery, Gibraltar. He was one of only five civilians awarded the VC. His medal (and a first edition of his book, How I Won The Victoria Cross) was held by Historical-Militaria.com in Toronto, Canada. The VC was sold at auction at Noonans Mayfair on 14 September 2022 for a record hammer price of £750,000.

In fiction
Kavanagh appears in George MacDonald Fraser's Flashman in the Great Game in which he is portrayed as a bungling glory-seeker who has to be led through the enemy lines by a reluctant and terrified Flashman.

Sources
 
 The Register of the Victoria Cross (1981, 1988 and 1997)

References

External links

Thomas Henry Kavanagh VC

National Army Museum

1821 births
1882 deaths
19th-century Irish people
People from Mullingar
Irish recipients of the Victoria Cross
Administrators in British India
Indian Rebellion of 1857 recipients of the Victoria Cross